Splendrillia is a genus of sea snails, marine gastropod mollusks in the family Drilliidae.

Fossils from this old genus have been found in Eocene strata of Antarctica, Oligocene and Miocene strata of Australia, Miocene strata of Germany, Japan and New Zealand and Quaternary strata of the United States; age range: 55.8 to 0.012 Ma.

Species
Species within the genus Splendrillia include:

 Splendrillia abdita Fallon, 2016
 Splendrillia academica McLean & Poorman, 1971
 Splendrillia acostata (Verco, 1909) 
 † Splendrillia aequistriata (Hutton, 1886) 
 † Splendrillia afflicta (Marwick, 1931) 
 Splendrillia alabastrum Kilburn, 1988
 Splendrillia albicans (Hinds, 1843)
 Splendrillia alticostata Fallon, 2016
 Splendrillia angularia Wells, 1995
 † Splendrillia annectens Powell, 1942 
 † Splendrillia anomala Powell, 1942 
 Splendrillia aomoriensis (Nomura & Hatai, 1940)
 Splendrillia aoteana Finlay H. J., 1930
 Splendrillia arga McLean & Poorman, 1971
 Splendrillia armata Powell, 1942
 Splendrillia aurora (Thiele, 1925)
 Splendrillia bahamasensis Fallon, 2016
 Splendrillia bartschi (Haas, 1941)
 Splendrillia basilirata Sysoev, 1990
 Splendrillia bednalli (Sowerby III, 1896)
 Splendrillia benthicola Dell, 1956
 Splendrillia biconica (N.E. Weisbord, 1962)
 Splendrillia boucheti Wells, 1995
 Splendrillia bozzettii Stahlschmidt, Poppe & Tagaro, 2018
 Splendrillia bratcherae McLean & Poorman, 1971
 Splendrillia braunsi M. Yokoyama, 1920
 Splendrillia brycei Wells, 1995
 Splendrillia buicki Wells, 1990
 Splendrillia campbellensis Sysoev & Kantor, 1989
 Splendrillia candidula (Hedley, 1922)
 Splendrillia carolae Wells, 1995
 Splendrillia chathamensis Sysoev & Kantor, 1989
 † Splendrillia clava Powell, 1942 
 † Splendrillia clifdenensis Powell, 1942
 Splendrillia clydonia (Melvill & Standen, 1901)
 Splendrillia coccinata (Reeve, 1845)
 Splendrillia compta Fallon, 2016
 Splendrillia crassiplicata (Kuroda, Habe & Oyama, 1971)
 † Splendrillia cristata Powell, 1942 
 Splendrillia cruzensis Fallon, 2016
 Splendrillia daviesi Kilburn, 1988
 Splendrillia debilis Finlay H. J., 1927
 Splendrillia disjecta (Smith E. A., 1888)
 Splendrillia dissimilis Fallon, 2016
 Splendrillia eburnea (Hedley, 1922)
 † Splendrillia edita Powell, 1942 
 Splendrillia elongata Wells, 1995: homonym but not synonym of † Splendrillia elongata Beu, 1970 
 † Splendrillia elongata Beu, 1970 
 Splendrillia espyra (Woodring, 1928)
 Splendrillia eva (Thiele, 1925)
 Splendrillia falsa (Barnard, 1958)
  † Splendrillia filiculosa (Marwick, 1931)
 Splendrillia flavopunctata Fallon, 2016
 Splendrillia globosa Wells, 1995
 Splendrillia granatella (Melvill & Standen, 1903)
 Splendrillia grandis Fallon, 2016
 Splendrillia gratiosa (Sowerby III, 1896)
 Splendrillia hansenae Wells, 1990
 Splendrillia hayesi Kilburn, 1998
 Splendrillia hedleyi Wells, 1990
 Splendrillia hermata Dell, 1956
 Splendrillia houbricki Wells, 1995
 Splendrillia intermaculata (Smith E. A., 1879)
 Splendrillia intermedia Wells, 1995
 Splendrillia interpunctata (E. A. Smith, 1882)
 Splendrillia jacula Dell, 1956
 Splendrillia jarosae Wells, 1991
 Splendrillia kapuranga Dell, 1953
 Splendrillia karukeraensis Fallon, 2016
 Splendrillia kingmai Marwick, 1965
  † Splendrillia koruahinensis (Bartrum & Powell, 1928)
 Splendrillia kylix Kilburn, 1988
 † Splendrillia laevissima Lozouet, 2017 †
 Splendrillia lalage (Dall, 1919)
 Splendrillia larochei Powell, 1940
 † Splendrillia lincta Powell, 1942 
 Splendrillia longbottomi Wells, 1990
 Splendrillia lucida (Nevill & Nevill, 1875)
 Splendrillia lygdina (Hedley, 1922)
 Splendrillia majorina Beu, 1979
 † Splendrillia marconensis Lozouet, 2017 
 Splendrillia masinoi Fallon, 2016
 Splendrillia mikrokamelos Kilburn, 1988
 Splendrillia minima Wells, 1995
 Splendrillia nenia (Hedley, 1903)
 Splendrillia obscura Sysoev, 1990
 Splendrillia otagoensis Powell, 1942
 Splendrillia panamensis Fallon, 2016
 Splendrillia persica (Smith E. A., 1888)
 Splendrillia powelli Wells, 1990 (junior homonym of † Splendrillia powelli (L. C. King, 1934) -a  replacement name will be published)
  † Splendrillia powelli (L. C. King, 1934)
 Splendrillia praeclara (Melvill, 1893)
 Splendrillia praeclara (Sowerby III, 1915) (junior homonym of Splendrillia praeclara (Melvill, 1893) - a replacement name will be published)
 Splendrillia problematica Wells, 1995
 Splendrillia raricostata (Smith E. A., 1879)
 Splendrillia resplendens (Melvill, 1898)
 Splendrillia roseacincta Dell, 1956
 Splendrillia runcinata Dell, 1956
 Splendrillia sarda Kilburn, 1988
 Splendrillia skambos Kilburn, 1988
 Splendrillia solicitata (Sowerby III, 1913)
 Splendrillia spadicina (Hedley, 1922)
 Splendrillia stegeri (Nowell-Usticke, 1959)
 Splendrillia stellae Fallon, 2016
 Splendrillia striata Wells, 1995
 † Splendrillia subspinifera Lozouet, 2017 
 Splendrillia subtilis Fallon, 2016
 Splendrillia subviridis (May, 1911)
 Splendrillia suluensis (Schepman, 1913)
 Splendrillia taylori Wells, 1995
 Splendrillia triconica Wells, 1995
 Splendrillia turrita (Wells, 1995)
 Splendrillia vinki (De Jong & Coomans, 1988)
 Splendrillia vivens (Powell, 1942)
 Splendrillia wayae Wells, 1995
 Splendrillia westralis Wells, 1993
 † Splendrillia whangaimoana Vella, 1954 
 Splendrillia woodsi (Beddome, 1883) 
 Splendrillia zanzibarica Sysoev, 1996
 Splendrillia zeobliqua Beu, 1979

Species brought into synonymy
 Splendrillia agasma B.C. Cotton, 1947: synonym of Splendrillia woodsi (R.H. Beddome, 1883)
 Splendrillia ansonae F.E. Wells, 1990: synonym of Crassispira ansonae F.E. Wells, 1990
 Splendrillia baileyi S.S. Berry, 1969: synonym of Splendrillia lalage (W.H. Dall, 1919)
 Splendrillia carolinae (Bartsch, 1934): synonym of Syntomodrillia carolinae Bartsch, 1934
 Splendrillia dampieria (Hedley, 1922): synonym of Inquisitor dampieria (Hedley, 1922)
 Splendrillia fucata (Reeve, 1845): synonym of Fenimorea fucata (Reeve, 1845)
 Splendrillia halidorema (Schwengel, 1940): synonym of Decoradrillia pulchella (Reeve, 1845)
 Splendrillia hosoi (Okutani, 1964): synonym of  Crassispira hosoi (Okutani, 1964)
 Splendrillia howitti G.B. Pritchard & J.H. Gatliff, 1899: synonym of Splendrillia woodsi (R.H. Beddome, 1883)
 Splendrillia hypsela (Watson, 1881): synonym of Syntomodrillia hypsela (Watson, 1881)
 Splendrillia innocens J.C. Melvill, 1923: synonym of Splendrillia coccinata (L.A. Reeve, 1845)
 Splendrillia janetae (Barnard, 1934): synonym of Fenimorea janetae Bartsch, 1934
 Splendrillia laeta (Hinds, 1843): synonym of Clavus laetus (Hinds, 1843)
 Splendrillia laevis F.W. Hutton, 1873: synonym of Splendrillia aoteana H.J. Finlay, 1930
 Splendrillia laevis H.H. Suter, 1908: synonym of Splendrillia debilis H.J. Finlay, 1927
 Splendrillia lissotropis (Dall, 1881): synonym of Syntomodrillia lissotropis (Dall, 1881)
 Splendrillia molleri C.F. Laseron, 1954: synonym of Splendrillia woodsi (R.H. Beddome, 1883)
 Splendrillia moseri (Dall, 1889): synonym of Fenimorea moseri (Dall, 1889)
 Splendrillia nodosa G.W. Nowell-Usticke, 1969: synonym of Splendrillia coccinata (L.A. Reeve, 1845)
 Splendrillia paria L.A. Reeve, 1846: synonym of Fenimorea fucata (L.A. Reeve, 1845)
 Splendrillia quisqualis J.W. Brazier, 1876: synonym of Splendrillia candidula (C. Hedley, 1922)
 Splendrillia stricta MANCA Wells: synonym of Splendrillia striata F.E. Wells, 1995
 Splendrillia sunderlandi Petuch, 1987: synonym of Fenimorea sunderlandi (Petuch, 1987)
 Splendrillia tantula (Bartsch, 1934): synonym of Syntomodrillia portoricana Fallon, 2016
 Splendrillia weldiana J.E. Tenison-Woods, 1876: synonym of Fenimorea fucata (L.A. Reeve, 1845)
 Splendrillia woodringi (Bartsch, 1934): synonym of Syntomodrillia woodringi Bartsch, 1934

References
 Hedley, Charles. A revision of the Australian Turridae. Vol. 13. 1922.
 Sysoev, A. V., and Yu I. Kantor. "Anatomy of molluscs of genus Splendrillia (Gastropoda: Toxoglossa: Turridae) with descriptions of two new bathyal species of the genus from New Zealand." New Zealand Journal of Zoology 16.2 (1989): 205-214.
 FE Wells, Revision of the Recent Australian Turridae referred to the genera Splendrillia and Austrodrillia, Journal of the Malacological Society of Australia, 1990
 Wells, F.E. (1995). A revision of the drilliid genera Splendrillia and Plagiostropha (Gastropoda: Conoidea) from New Caledonia, with additional records from other areas, in: Bouchet, P. (Ed.) (1995). Résultats des campagnes MUSORSTOM: 14. Mémoires du Muséum national d'histoire naturelle. Série A, Zoologie, 167: pp. 527–556
 Fallon P.J. (2016). Taxonomic review of tropical western Atlantic shallow water Drilliidae (Mollusca: Gastropoda: Conoidea) including descriptions of 100 new species. Zootaxa. 4090(1): 1-363

External links
 De Jong K.M. & Coomans H.E. (1988) Marine gastropods from Curaçao, Aruba and Bonaire. Leiden: E.J. Brill. 261 pp.